The 2012 United States House of Representatives election in Delaware took place on Tuesday, November 6, 2012. Voters elected a member of the United States House of Representatives to represent Delaware's At-large congressional district, encompassing the entire state of Delaware. Incumbent Democratic Representative John Carney defeated Republican challenger Tom Kovach to win a second term.

Democratic nomination

Candidates

Nominee
 John Carney, incumbent U.S. Representative

Republican nomination

Candidates

Nominee
 Tom Kovach, New Castle County Council president

Eliminated in primary
 Rose Izzo, conservative freelance political consultant and candidate for the seat in 2010

Results

General election

Candidates
 John Carney (D), incumbent U.S. Representative
 Tom Kovach (R), New Castle County Council president
 Scott Gesty (L), accountant. Gesty has also been endorsed by the Independent Party of Delaware.
 Bernie August (Green)

Results

References

External links
 State Election Commissioner of Delaware
 United States House of Representatives elections in Delaware, 2012 at Ballotpedia
 Campaign contributions at OpenSecrets
 Outside spending at the Sunlight Foundation

Official campaign websites (Archived)
 John Carney campaign website
 Scott Gesty campaign website
 Rose Izzo campaign website
 Tom Kovach campaign website

2012
United States House of Representatives
Delaware